The R313 is a Regional Route in South Africa that connects Prieska with the N8 between Griquatown and Groblershoop.

External links
 Routes Travel Info

Regional Routes in the Northern Cape